Social Deviantz are a Canadian rap trio from Vancouver, British Columbia, currently on indefinite hiatus. The group consists of lyricists A-Train and Fatbone, and DJ/producer Junya. They are noted for their unique downtempo style of hip hop music, and for being one of the pioneers of the Vancouver rap scene, specifically for their musical and cultural contributions.

History
Social Deviantz were formed in early 1992 as part of the Sugarshack roster of artists. Their most notable release continues to be their debut full-length album, Essential Mental Nutrients, first distributed in 1996.

As well as two full-length albums, Social Deviantz have released a handful of EPs (including the 2001 vinyl release, Space + Time, issued only in the United States). Two of their singles, "Minimal" and "Lucky 5", received global airplay, including locally on Vancouver's The Beat 94.5 radio station.

Social Deviantz have also appeared on Muchmusic and YTV for interviews.

In 2006 the band released a long-shelved album Bleaky Deky, and in 2009 Spread (a compilation of previously released tracks) was distributed. A video release for "Red Tape", resulted in play on multiple networks including Fuse, MTV, and a spin on Halloween night 2008 on Rage (ABC1 Australia).

In 2019, a vinyl reissue of Essential Mental Nutrients was released by Diggers With Gratitude.

Members
 A-Train - emcee
 Fatbone - emcee
 Junya - DJ/producer

Discography

References

External links
 Epitonic
 MySpace

Musical groups established in 1992
Musical groups from Vancouver
Canadian hip hop groups
1992 establishments in British Columbia